Women's Basketball is growing in Iraq since the first the second Gulf War. Which became a subject of the documentary Salaam Dunk.

References

External links
Asia-Basket/Iraq
Iraqi Basketball Association - Facebook presentation

Women's national basketball teams
Basketball
Basketball in Iraq
Basketball teams in Iraq